Idols of the Radio  is a 1934 Argentine tango film directed by Eduardo Morera and written by Nicolás de las Llanderas and Arnaldo Malfatti. Starring Ada Falcon, Tito Lusiardo and Tita Merello.

Cast
Ada Falcon
Olinda Bozán
Ignacio Corsini
Tito Lusiardo
Antonio Podestá
Pablo Osvaldo Valle
Dora Davis
Don Dean
Mario Fortuna
Eduardo de Labar
Tita Merello
Olga Mon

External links
 

Argentine musical films
1934 films
1930s Spanish-language films
Argentine black-and-white films
Tango films
Films directed by Eduardo Morera
1934 musical films
1930s Argentine films